Tropaeolum tuberosum (mashua, see below for other names) is a species of flowering plant in the family Tropaeolaceae, grown in the Andes, particularly in Peru and Bolivia, and to a lesser extent in Ecuador as well as in some areas of Colombia, for its edible tubers, which are eaten cooked or roasted as a vegetable. It is a minor food source, especially to native Amerindian populations. It is related to garden nasturtiums, and is occasionally cultivated as an ornamental for its brightly coloured tubular flowers.

Alternative names
This plant is commonly called mashua in Peru and Ecuador, but other names include:

In Boyacá, Colombia it is also named Nabu

Agronomy
The plant grows vigorously even in marginal soils and it competes well with weeds.  It is well-adapted to high-altitude subsistence agriculture, and gives high yields; 30 tonnes per hectare are yielded at a height of 3000 metres, but up to 70 tons per hectare have been produced under research conditions. Its extraordinary resistance to insect, nematode and bacterial pests is attributed to high levels of isothiocyanates. Although mashua is fully domesticated, it can persist in wild vegetation because of its aggressive growth and robustness. In Colombia, it is planted as a companion crop to repel pests in potato fields.

Culinary Use
Raw mashua tuber is bitter due to glucosinolates, but the bitterness diminishes after cooking, freezing, or pounding. The tubers comprise as much as 75 percent of the mature plants by dry weight (40 percent is typical for cereals).  Up to 75 percent of dry matter reaches the tubercle.

Popularization of mashua may be limited by its strong flavor, and its reputation as an anaphrodisiac. Father Bernabé Cobo records that in the 16th century the Inca used to give enormous amounts of mashua to their troops so that they would forget their wives. However, mashua tubers roasted in traditional earthen field ovens, built at harvest, are considered a delicacy. Also, the raw tubers can be shredded thinly and added to salads, to confer a spicy flavour and crunchy texture.

Cultivation as an ornamental
In its native range, mashua is mainly cultivated for its edible tubers, but it has ornamental value in the temperate zone because of its trailing habit and showy, bi-coloured tubular flowers, which appear in summer and autumn. The sepals are orange-red while the petals are bright yellow. In areas prone to frost, it requires some protection in winter. The cultivar T. tuberosum var. lineamaculatum 'Ken Aslet' has gained the Royal Horticultural Society's Award of Garden Merit.

Medicinal properties
Mashua has putative anaphrodisiac effects.  It has been recorded by the Spanish chronicler Cobo that mashua was fed to their armies by the Inca Emperors, "that they should forget their wives".  Studies of male rats fed on mashua tubers have shown a 45% drop in testosterone levels due to the presence of isothiocyanates. Mashua contains Docosatetraenoylethanolamide, a cannabinoid structurally similar to Anandamide that also acts on the cannabinoid (CB1) receptor among other structurally related compounds such as N–oleoyldopamine.

See also
Oca
New World crops
Ulluco
Yacon

References

tuberosum
Root vegetables
Perennial vegetables
Crops originating from the Americas
Crops originating from Peru
Anaphrodisia
Crops originating from Bolivia
Crops originating from Colombia
Crops originating from Ecuador
Plants described in 1802